Danilo Bulevardi (born 31 January 1995) is an Italian footballer who plays as a midfielder for  club Gubbio.

Club career
He made his Serie B debut for Pescara on 30 May 2014 in a game against Empoli.

On 27 September 2019, he signed a 1-year contract with an additional 1-year extension option with Serie C club Cavese.

On 11 August 2021, he joined to Gubbio.

References

External links
 
 

1995 births
Living people
People from Mazara del Vallo
Footballers from Sicily
Sicily international footballers
Italian footballers
Association football midfielders
Serie B players
Serie C players
Delfino Pescara 1936 players
S.S. Ischia Isolaverde players
L'Aquila Calcio 1927 players
S.S. Teramo Calcio players
Pordenone Calcio players
A.C.N. Siena 1904 players
Cavese 1919 players
F.C. Legnago Salus players
A.S. Gubbio 1910 players
Sportspeople from the Province of Trapani